The Uzbekistan Railways are the national rail carrier of Uzbekistan. The company owns and operates all railways within the country. It is a state-owned stock company, formed in 1994 to operate railways within Uzbekistan. As of March 2017, the total length of its main railway network is 4,669 km (2,446 km of which is electrified). It employs 54,700 people.

Routes

References

External links
Uzbekistan Railways company website 

Companies of Uzbekistan
Rail transport in Uzbekistan
Railway companies established in 1994